Simon of Cyrene (Standard Hebrew Šimʿon, Tiberian Hebrew Šimʿôn; , Simōn Kyrēnaios) was the man compelled by the Romans to carry the cross of Jesus of Nazareth as Jesus was taken to his crucifixion, according to all three Synoptic Gospels: He was also the father of the disciples Rufus and Alexander.

Simon is not mentioned in the Gospel of John.

Background
Cyrene was a Greek city in the province of Cyrenaica, in eastern Libya, in northern Africa. It had a Jewish community, where 100,000 Judean Jews had been forced to settle during the reign of Ptolemy Soter (323–285 BC), and was an early center of Christianity.

The Cyrenian Jews had a synagogue in Jerusalem, where many went for annual feasts.

Biblical accounts
Simon's act of carrying the cross, patibulum (crossbeam in Latin), for Jesus is the fifth or seventh of the Stations of the Cross. Some interpret the passage as indicating that Simon was chosen because he may have shown sympathy with Jesus. Others point out that the text itself says nothing, that he had no choice, and that there is no basis to consider the carrying of the cross an act of sympathetic generosity.

Mark 15:21 identifies Simon as "the father of Alexander and Rufus". Tradition states that they became missionaries; the inclusion of their names may suggest that they were of some standing in the Early Christian community at Rome. It has also been suggested that the Rufus (in Greek: Ῥοῦφον or Rhouphon) mentioned by Paul in Romans  is the son of Simon of Cyrene. Some also link Simon himself with the "men of Cyrene" who preached the Gospel to the Greeks in Acts . On the other hand, Simon's name alone does not prove he was Jewish, and Alexander and Rufus were both common names and may have referred to others.

A burial cave in the Kidron Valley discovered in 1941 by E. L. Sukenik, belonging to Cyrenian Jews and dating before AD 70, was found to have an ossuary inscribed twice in Greek "Alexander son of Simon". It cannot, however, be certain that this refers to the same person.

Gnostic views

According to some Gnostic traditions, Simon of Cyrene, by mistaken identity, suffered the events leading up to the crucifixion. This is the story presented in the Second Treatise of the Great Seth, although it is unclear whether Simon or another actually died on the cross. This is part of a belief held by some Gnostics that Jesus was not of flesh, but only took on the appearance of flesh (see also Basilides, and Swoon hypothesis).

Basilides, in his gospel of Basilides, is reported by Irenaeus as having taught a docetic doctrine of Christ's passion. He states the teaching that Christ, in Jesus, as a wholly divine being, could not suffer bodily pain and did not die on the cross; but that the person crucified was, in fact, Simon of Cyrene. Irenaeus quotes Basiledes:

He appeared on earth as a man and performed miracles. Thus he himself did not suffer. Rather, a certain Simon of Cyrene was compelled to carry his cross for him. It was he who was ignorantly and erroneously crucified, being transfigured by him, so that he might be thought to be Jesus.  Moreover, Jesus assumed the form of Simon, and stood by laughing at them.Irenaeus, Against Heresies

In popular culture
According to the visions of Anne Catherine Emmerich, Simon was a pagan. The Romans recognized he was not a Jew by his clothes and then chose him to oblige him to help Jesus carry the cross.

Poet Ridgely Torrence wrote a play about him titled Simon the Cyrenian. A 1920 YWCA production of this play was directed by Dora Cole, sister of composer Bob Cole, and starred Paul Robeson.

Sidney Poitier was cast as Simon of Cyrene in The Greatest Story Ever Told that was directed by George Stevens and released in 1965.

In the 1979 comedy film Monty Python's Life of Brian is a vignette alluding to Simon of Cyrene. A seemingly pious and generous man offers to one of the condemned carrying a cross, "Brother, let me shoulder your burden." Upon doing so, the condemned man runs off, leaving the generous man stuck with the cross and future crucifixion.

The film The Passion of the Christ portrays Simon as a Jew who, having been forced by the Romans to carry the cross, is initially unwilling but comes to show compassion to Jesus and helps him.

Movements
Both the Simon Community, and the Cyrenian movement (which provides services to homeless and other disadvantaged groups in the UK) take their name from Simon of Cyrene.

See also 
 Chapel of Simon of Cyrene

References

External links
 

Ancient Libyans
Christian saints from the New Testament
Libyan saints
People in the canonical gospels
Saints from the Holy Land
Saints of Roman Cyrenaica
Stations of the Cross